Longkhüm is a village located 17 km south-west of Mokokchung, in Nagaland, North-East India. It is situated at an altitude of 1846 m above sea level.  A vanguard village of the Aos in the days of headhunting, it is strategically situated and commands a view of the surrounding hills and valleys. The people of this village are hard working and one can find exquisite handicrafts and handloom items in this village. On a clear day, one can view the eastern Himalayas of Arunachal and beyond and also the industrial smoke bellowing from the industries in Assam. The Aos have a belief that Longkhüm is the resting place of the spirit of dead on their onward journey to paradise. Mongzu Ki - eagle's eyrie - is situated at a high precipice where eagles have nested for centuries. According to Ao mythology, eagles are the manifestations of the spirits of the dead.

Longkhüm is linked by road to National Highway-61.

External links 
https://web.archive.org/web/20070928044356/http://www.reckonindia.com/nagaland/tourism/mokokchu.asp
Longkhum in Mokokchung India

Mokokchung
Ao villages
Villages in Mokokchung district
Tourism in Nagaland